Ioanna "Nana" Mouskouri (born 13 October 1934) is a Greek singer. Over the span of her career, she has released over 200 albums in at least twelve languages, including Greek, French, English, German, Dutch, Portuguese, Italian, Japanese, Spanish, Hebrew, Welsh, Mandarin Chinese and Corsican.

Mouskouri became well known throughout Europe for the song "The White Rose of Athens", recorded first in German as "Weiße Rosen aus Athen" as an adaptation of her Greek song "" (San sfyríxeis tris forés, "When you whistle three times"). It became her first record to sell over one million copies.

Later in 1963, she represented Luxembourg at the Eurovision Song Contest with the song "À force de prier". Her friendship with the composer Michel Legrand led to the recording by Mouskouri of the theme song of the Oscar-nominated film The Umbrellas of Cherbourg. From 1968 to 1976, she hosted her own TV show produced by BBC, Presenting Nana Mouskouri. Her popularity as a multilingual television personality and distinctive image, owing to the then unusual signature black-rimmed glasses, turned Mouskouri into an international star.

"Je chante avec toi Liberté", recorded in 1981, is perhaps her biggest hit to date, performed in at least five languages – French, English as "Song for Liberty", German as "Lied der Freiheit", Spanish as "Libertad" and Portuguese as "Liberdade". "Only Love", a song recorded in 1985 as the theme song of TV series Mistral's Daughter, gained worldwide popularity along with its other versions in French (as "L'Amour en Héritage"), Italian (as "Come un'eredità"), Spanish (as "La dicha del amor"), and German (as "Aber die Liebe bleibt"). It became her only UK hit single when it reached number two in February 1986.

Mouskouri became a spokesperson for UNICEF in 1993 and was elected to the European Parliament as a Greek deputy from 1994 to 1999.

In 2015 she was awarded the Echo Music Prize for Outstanding achievements by the German music association Deutsche Phono-Akademie.

Early years
Nana Mouskouri was born on 13 October 1934 in Chania, Crete, where her father, Constantine, worked as a film projectionist in a local cinema; her mother, Alice, worked in the same cinema as an usherette. When Mouskouri was three, her family moved to Athens.

Mouskouri's family sent her and her older sister Eugenía (Jenny) to the Athens Conservatoire. Although Mouskouri had displayed exceptional musical talent from age six, Jenny initially appeared to be the more gifted sibling. Financially unable to support both girls' studies, the parents asked their tutor which one should continue.  The sister conceded that Jenny had the better voice, but Nana was the one with the true inner need to sing.  Mouskouri has said that a medical examination revealed she only has one functioning vocal cord and this could well account for her remarkable singing voice (in her younger years ranging from a husky, dark alto, which she later dropped, to a ringing coloratura mezzo), as opposed to her breathy, raspy speaking voice.

Mouskouri's early childhood was marked by the German Nazi occupation of Greece. Her father became part of the anti-Nazi resistance movement in Athens. Mouskouri began singing lessons at age 12. As a child, she listened to radio broadcasts of singers including Frank Sinatra, Ella Fitzgerald, Billie Holiday, and Édith Piaf.

In 1950, she was accepted at the Conservatoire. She studied classical music with an emphasis on singing opera. After eight years at the Conservatoire, Mouskouri was encouraged by her friends to experiment with jazz music. She began singing with her friends' jazz group at night. However, when Mouskouri's Conservatory professor found out about Mouskouri's involvement with a genre of music that was not in keeping with her classical studies, he prevented her from sitting for her end-of-year exams. During an episode of Joanna Lumley's Greek Odyssey, shown on the UK ITV channel in the autumn of 2011, Mouskouri told the actress Joanna Lumley how she had been scheduled to sing at the amphitheatre at Epidauros with other students of the Conservatoire, when upon arrival at the amphitheatre word came through from the Conservatoire in Athens that she had just been barred from participating in the performance there owing to her involvement in light music. Mouskouri subsequently left the Conservatoire and began performing at the Zaki club in Athens.

She began singing jazz in nightclubs with a bias towards Ella Fitzgerald repertoire. In 1957, she recorded her first song, "Fascination", in both Greek and English for Odeon/EMI Greece. By 1958 while still performing at the Zaki, she met Greek composer Manos Hadjidakis. Hadjidakis was impressed by Nana's voice and offered to write songs for her. In 1959 Mouskouri performed Hadjidakis' "Κάπου υπάρχει η αγάπη μου" (Kápou ipárchi i agápi mou, "Somewhere my love exists"; co-written with poet Nikos Gatsos) at the inaugural Greek Song Festival. The song won first prize, and Mouskouri began to be noticed.

At the 1960 Greek Song Festival, she performed two more Hadjidakis compositions, "Τιμωρία" (Timōría, "Punishment") and "Κυπαρισσάκι" (Kyparissáki, "Little cypress"). Both these songs tied for first prize. Mouskouri performed Kostas Yannidis' composition, "Ξύπνα αγάπη μου" (Xýpna agápi mou, "Wake up, my love"), at the Mediterranean Song Festival, held in Barcelona that year. The song won first prize, and she went on to sign a recording contract with Paris-based Philips-Fontana.

In 1961, Mouskouri performed the soundtrack of a German documentary about Greece. This resulted in the German-language single Weiße Rosen aus Athen ("White Roses from Athens"). The song was originally adapted by Hadjidakis from a folk melody. It became a success, selling over a million copies in Germany. The song was later translated into several  languages and it went on to become one of Mouskouri's signature tunes.

Family life
Mouskouri has been married twice: first at age 25, to Yorgos (George) Petsilas, a guitarist in her backing band (the trio "The Athenians") and the first man she had kissed. They had two children (Nicolas Petsilas in 1968 and Hélène (Lénou) Petsilas in 1970) but divorced when Mouskouri was 39. Not long after that, she started a relationship with her record producer André Chapelle, but they did not marry then because she "didn't want to bring another father into the family" and divorce was against her conservative upbringing. They eventually married on January 13, 2003, and live primarily in Switzerland.

Life outside Greece
In 1960, Mouskouri moved to Paris.  She performed Luxembourg's entry in the Eurovision Song Contest 1963, "À force de prier". Although the song achieved only eighth place in the contest, it achieved commercial success, and helped win her the prestigious Grand Prix du Disque in France. Mouskouri soon attracted the attention of French composer Michel Legrand, who composed two songs which became major French hits for her: "Les Parapluies de Cherbourg" (1964) and an arrangement of Katherine K. Davis's "Carol of the Drum", "L'Enfant au Tambour" (1965).

In 1962, she met Quincy Jones, who persuaded her to travel to New York City to record an album of American jazz titled The Girl from Greece Sings. Following that she scored another hit in the United Kingdom with the song "My Colouring Book" (later included in her 1973 album Songs from her TV series). In 1965, she recorded her second English-language album to be released in the United States, entitled Nana Sings. American singer Harry Belafonte heard and liked the album. Belafonte brought Mouskouri on tour with him through 1966. They teamed for a duo album entitled An Evening With Belafonte/Mouskouri. During this tour, Belafonte suggested that Mouskouri remove her signature black-rimmed glasses when on stage. She was so unhappy with the request that she wanted to quit the show after only two days. Finally, Belafonte relented and respected her wish to perform while wearing glasses.

On September 15, 1965, Mouskouri appeared for the first time on American television with Harry Belafonte on the Danny Kaye Show. While on the show Mouskouri performed "Telalima" followed by "Σήκω χόρεψε κουκλί μου" (Siko horepse koukli mou) accompanied by Harry Belafonte and Danny Kaye.
 
Mouskouri's 1967 French album Le Jour où la colombe raised her to super-stardom in France. This album featured many of her French songs, "Au cœur de septembre", "Adieu Angélina", "Robe bleue, robe blanche" and the French pop classic "Le Temps des cerises". Mouskouri made her first appearance at Paris' legendary Olympia concert theatre the same year, singing French pop, Greek folk, and Hadjidakis numbers.

These successes across Europe and elsewhere impressed Yvonne Littlewood, the BBC producer who had first met Mouskouri at the 1963 Eurovision Song Contest in London. Following several successful guest appearances on British TV after her Eurovision performance, the BBC then invited Mouskouri and her backing group, the Athenians, to start hosting a TV series called Presenting… Nana Mouskouri from 1968 onwards. A typical episode of her series would contain contemporary British, American and French pop and folk music, popular classical pieces, and the Greek songs which had originally made her famous. The shows also featured European and world music stars of the time as guests, making it one of the first BBC TV series to do so regularly. Despite the fact that stars from mainland Europe singing in languages other than English have tended to find it difficult to break into the British market, the series proved very popular with viewers of the new BBC-2 channel, and it ran until the mid-1970s. As well as performing songs known to the British audience in her shows, Mouskouri also welcomed the television audience, chatted to her guest stars and gave spoken introductions to her French and Greek songs in fluent English. These introductions, along with a modest stage presence and her bespectacled appearance, made her a very distinctive star, as Yvonne Littlewood later explained:

 "I suppose it was unusual to see a singer wearing glasses. She didn't look like everyone else. She didn't have blonde hair, and she was very distinctive in her appearance. […] You know, we should remember that, in those days, we didn't have all the holiday programmes, so Greek music and anything Greek wasn’t as well known to the average public as it is now. […] She would give the gist [in English] of the subject of the song before she sang it, and that was really quite unique and quite charming."

In 1969, Mouskouri released a full-length British LP, Over and over, which reached number 10 and spent 102 weeks in the UK album charts. This was the first of a series of English-language albums which, boosted by her TV appearances, sold extremely well in the UK and Ireland, as well as in other European countries, during the early 1970s, including The exquisite Nana Mouskouri (1969), Turn on the sun (1970), A place in my heart (1971) and Presenting... Nana Mouskouri (1973), while concerts from two of her British tours were also recorded and released as LPs: British Concert (1972) and Live at the Albert Hall (1974).

Mouskouri's international appeal encouraged the BBC to sell her programmes to television stations across the world, a fact which she acknowledged in a BBC interview in 2014:

 "This series – I mean, for about 10 years I was doing every year the series on BBC-2… and they went everywhere… in Asia… of course in the Commonwealth… but even in South America… so that I think that I owe to the BBC a lot. And to Yvonne Littlewood, really."

Mouskouri also hosted her own shows for French and West German broadcasters during this period. At a time when TV programmes could attract huge audiences, her popularity as a multilingual television personality turned her into a truly international star.
 
Although music series such as hers were becoming less common on British TV as the 1970s wore on, the BBC continued to engage her regularly for one-off television specials and guest appearances on other programmes until the mid-1980s, by which time she had been a regular contributor to British TV for more than 20 years. Meanwhile, during the 1970s and 1980s, she expanded her concert tour to include her new fans, not only in the United Kingdom, but also in Ireland, New Zealand, Japan and Australia, where she met  Frank Hardy, who followed her to the south of France in 1976.

In the 1970s, Mouskouri - always a prolific recording artist - recorded several LPs in German, including the hit albums, Sieben schwarze Rosen (1975) and Lieder, die die Liebe schreibt (1978). During the same period, she continued to release a series of top-selling records in France, such as Comme un soleil (1971), Une voix qui vient du cœur (1972), Vieilles chansons de France (1973), and Quand tu chantes (1976). Meanwhile, Passport, a compilation including her most popular songs in English, reached number 3 in the UK album charts in 1976 and won for her a gold disc.

In August 1974, while in Australia, Mouskouri was presented with a plaque representing the sale of twenty Gold Records.

As her fame began spreading outside her fan base in Europe, the United States, and the Commonwealth, Mouskouri was asked to  record songs for the Japanese market. Meanwhile, in 1976, a renowned Taiwanese author, Echo, heard her music and introduced it to one of her female radio DJ friends. Mouskouri's records then became popular in Taiwan, especially among high school and college students, with one of her British albums, Nana's book of songs (1974) becoming particularly popular.

Middle years
In 1979, Mouskouri released another English-language album named Roses and Sunshine. This album consisted largely of folk and country material, and included work from sources including Neil Young, Dolly Parton, Bob Dylan and John Denver. It was well received in Canada, and one of the album's tracks, "Even Now" (not the same song as the 1978 Barry Manilow hit), became a staple on beautiful music radio stations in the United States. She scored a worldwide hit in 1981 with "Je chante avec toi Liberté", which was translated into several languages after its success in France. The momentum from this album also helped boost her following German album, Meine Lieder sind mein Leben. In 1984, Mouskouri returned to Greece and performed to a large audience at the Odeon of Herodes Atticus; her first performance in her homeland since 1962.

In 1985, Mouskouri recorded "Only Love", the theme song to the British TV series Mistral's Daughter – based upon the novel by Judith Krantz – which reached number 2 in the UK charts. The song was also a hit in its other versions: L'Amour en Héritage (French), Come un'eredità (Italian), La dicha del amor (Spanish), and Aber die Liebe bleibt (German). The German version was also recorded with an alternate set of lyrics under the title Der wilde Wein but was withdrawn in favour of Aber die Liebe bleibt.

That same year, Mouskouri made a play for the Spanish-language market with the hit single Con Toda el Alma. The song was a major success in Spain, Argentina and Chile.

She released five albums in different languages in 1987, and the following year returned to her classical conservatory roots with the double LP The Classical Nana (a.k.a. Nana Classique), which featured adaptations of classical songs and excerpts from opera. By the end of 1987, she had performed a series of concerts in Asia, including South Korea, Taiwan, Singapore, Hong Kong, Malaysia and Thailand.

Later years
Mouskouri's 1991 English album, Only Love: The Best of Nana Mouskouri, became her best-selling release in the United States. She spent much of the 1990s touring the globe. Among her early 1990s albums were spiritual music, Gospel (1990), the Spanish-language Nuestras Canciones, the multilingual, Mediterranean-themed Côté Sud, Côté Coeur (1992), Dix Mille Ans Encore, Falling in Love Again: Great Songs From the Movies. Falling in Love featured two duets with Harry Belafonte.

In 1993, Mouskouri recorded the album Hollywood. Produced by Michel Legrand it was a collection of famous songs from films, and served not only as a tribute to the world of cinema, but also as a personal reference to childhood memories of sitting with her father in his projection room in Crete.

She recorded several more albums over 1996 and 1997, including the Spanish Nana Latina (which featured duets with Julio Iglesias and Mercedes Sosa), the English-language Return to Love, and the French pop classics, Hommages. In 1997, she staged a high-profile Concert for Peace at the Cathedral of St. John the Divine in New York. This concert was later released as an album, and aired as a TV special on PBS in the United States.

On 30 May 2013, Mouskouri was awarded an honorary degree by McGill University, Canada.

UNICEF and politics
Mouskouri was appointed a UNICEF Goodwill Ambassador in October 1993. She took over from the previous ambassador, the recently deceased actress Audrey Hepburn. Mouskouri's first U.N. mission took her to Bosnia to draw attention to the plight of children affected by the Bosnian war. She went on to give a series of fund-raising concerts in Sweden and Belgium.

She was a Member of the European Parliament for Greece through the centre-right New Democracy party from 1994 until 1999, when she resigned from her position as an MEP. Several reasons have been given for the resignation, one being her pacifism, and another being that she felt ill-equipped for the day-to-day work of a politician.

21st century

Mouskouri lives in Switzerland with Chapelle, and, until her final performance in 2008, performed hundreds of concerts every year throughout her career.  In 2004, her French record company released a 34-CD box set of more than 600 of Mouskouri's mostly French songs.  In 2006 she made a guest appearance at that year's Eurovision Song Contest which was held, for the first time ever, in her native Greece.

In the same year, she announced her plans to retire. From 2005 until 2008, she conducted a farewell concert tour of Europe, Australia, New Zealand, Asia, South America, the United States, and Canada. On July 23 and 24, 2008, Mouskouri gave her two final 'Farewell Concert' performances at the ancient Herodes Atticus Theatre, in Athens, Greece, before a packed stadium, including Greece's Prime Minister and Athens mayor, plus the mayors of Berlin, Paris and Luxembourg, along with fans from around the world and thousands of her Athenian admirers.

In 2010, in response to the financial crisis in Greece, Mouskouri announced that she would forgo her pension to contribute to the country's recovery. She commented: "Everywhere I see stories about my country going bankrupt. And people are aggressive about it. It's frightening. And it's painful for me. Nobody wants their country to be treated badly. It's frustrating and very sad."

In late 2011, Mouskouri released two newly recorded CDs, the first featuring songs of the Greek Islands, recorded with other Greek singers, and the second featuring duets with French contemporaries. In late November 2011 Mouskouri sang again at a single concert, with guests, in Berlin, commemorating the 50th anniversary of her hit single "The White Rose of Athens". She then did a concert tour in Germany in 2012. At age 80, she embarked on a three-year Happy Birthday Tour and in 2018 had booked a five-month Forever Young Tour through parts of Europe and North America.

In 2015 she was awarded with the Echo Music Prize for Outstanding achievements by the German music association Deutsche Phono-Akademie.

In popular culture
The British comedian Benny Hill impersonated Mouskouri on The Benny Hill Show. Wearing a long dress, large glasses and long black hair, he talked and sang with a slow and quiet voice. He introduced a song with a long translation into English of all the events supposedly mentioned in the song... and then sang just a single line of "Greek".

Andrea Martin played Mouskouri in a sketch, 'The Nana Mouskouri Story', during the 1981–1982 season of SCTV (later included in a DVD compilation).

In 1976, Ronnie Barker performed a song in drag as a parody of Mouskouri in The Two Ronnies as Nana Moussaka. Mouskouri was also parodied in the first episode of the 1970s New Zealand political satire A Week Of It.

In 1991, British comedienne Victoria Wood mentioned Mouskouri in her original song, "The Reincarnation Song." The song was included in Wood's television special of that year, Victoria Wood: Sold Out.

In the Ed, Edd n Eddy episode O-Ed-Eleven, Eddy's brother is shown to have a Nana Mouskouri poster in his old bedroom.

Karl Pilkington included Mouskouri as a clue in his contest 'Rockbusters', part of the radio show The Ricky Gervais Show on XFM. Broadcasting on December 31, 2005, the clue was "Me granny's taking a penalty. She better get the ball in the back of the net," initials (NM) = Nana Mouskouri (nanna must score 'ere). Gervais described this clue as "one of his best clues ever."

In 2015, Liina Vahtrik parodied her song "Only Love" on the Estonian version of Your Face Sounds Familiar.

Chart records and certifications 
United Kingdom

In the UK, Mouskouri performed quite successfully. Her 1976 release titled Passport was certified Gold while her 1977 album The Magic of Nana Mouskouri also attained Gold status a year after it was released. She also had two other silver certified albums, Alone (1986) and At Her Very Best (2001).

France

In France, Mouskouri achieved her first gold certification in 1995 with her 1987 release titled Nana Mouskouri 1. Three years after, she scored her second Gold record with her 1987 album Master Serie Vo. 1.

Germany

In Germany, Mouskouri has six albums that received certifications from BVMI. Her best selling album in the country is Nana Mouskouri In New York which received 5× Gold in 2015 for selling over 750,000 in Germany. Other albums that received 1× Gold certification includes the albums Die schönsten deutschen Weihnachtslieder, Lieder, die die Liebe schreibt, Alles Liebe, Die Welt ist voll Licht and Sieben schwarze Rosen.

The United States

In the US, her album titled Only Love - The Best of Nana Mouskouri charted and peaked at #141 on Billboard 200, spending six weeks on chart. This is her highest charting project in the country. In 2007, I'll Remember You peaked at #22 on Billboard Traditional Jazz Albums and #42 on Billboard Jazz Albums. In 1998, Concert for Peace peaked at #7 on Billboard World Albums and charted for six weeks.

Canada

In Canada, Je Chante Avec Toi Liberte was certified platinum in 1985 for selling over 100,000 copies in the country. Her 2018 and most recent album Forever Young debuted at #73 on Billboard Canadian Albums.

Others

In 2003, Arion Greek Music Awards honored Mouskouri with a Lifetime Achievement Award.

In 2015, Echo Awards honored Mouskouri with a Lifetime Achievement Award for her undeniable impact and legacy.

In 1992, Spin Magazine included Mouskouri on their list of "7 chart-toppers you won't see on MTV" and stated that Mouskouri sells two million records each year worldwide and has released about 800 albums in seven different languages.

In 1996, Platinum Europe Awards handed Mouskouri a special award saying "Europe is a great musical culture". She also received a Golden Disc Award for "Weisse Rosen Aus Athen" and became the first Philip artist to reach one million sales.

The single titled "White Roses from Athens” was released in 1961, which stayed at number 1 on the charts for 39 weeks and sold more than 1.5 million copies within six months.

Discography

Notable albums
{|class="wikitable plainrowheaders" style="text-align:center;" border="1"
|+ List of albums, with selected chart positions, sales, and certifications
! scope="col" rowspan="2" style="width:12em;"| Title
! scope="col" rowspan="2" style="width:20em;"| Album details
! scope="col" colspan="10"| Peak chart positions
! scope="col" rowspan="2" style="width:14em;"| Certifications
|-
! scope="col" style="width:3em;font-size:85%;"|GRE
! scope="col" style="width:3em;font-size:85%;"|AUT
! scope="col" style="width:3em;font-size:85%;"|BEL
! scope="col" style="width:3em;font-size:85%;"|CAN
! scope="col" style="width:3em;font-size:85%;"|FRA
! scope="col" style="width:3em;font-size:85%;"| GER
! scope="col" style="width:3em;font-size:85%;"|NET
! scope="col" style="width:3em;font-size:85%;"|NZ
! scope="col" style="width:3em;font-size:85%;"| SPA
! scope="col" style="width:3em;font-size:85%;"|UK
|-
! scope="row" | In New York the Girl from Greece Sings
|
Released: 1962
Label: Mercury
Formats: LP
|7
|—
|—
|—
|—
|—
|—
|—
|—
|—
|
BVMI: 5× Gold
|-
! scope="row" | Le Disque d'or de Nana Mouskouri
|
Released: 1964
Label: Fontana
Formats: LP, cassette
|—
|—
|—
|—
|—
|—
|—
|—
|—
|—
|
CRIA: Gold
|-
! scope="row" | Over and Over
|
Released: 1969
Label: Fontana
Formats: LP
|—
|—
|—
|—
|—
|—
|—
|—
|—
|10
|
|-
! scope="row" | The Exquisite Nana Mouskouri
|
Released: 1969
Label: Fontana
Formats: LP
|—
|—
|—
|—
|—
|—
|—
|—
|—
|10
|
|-
! scope="row" | Recital 70'''
|
Released: 1970
Label: Fontana
Formats: LP
|—
|—
|—
|—
|—
|—
|—
|—
|—
|68
|
|-
! scope="row" | Turn On The Sun|
Released: 1970
Label: Fontana
Formats: LP
|—
|—
|—
|—
|—
|—
|—
|—
|—
|16
|
|-
! scope="row" | Nana Mouskouri's Grand Gala|
Released: 1970
Label: Fontana
Formats: LP
|—
|—
|—
|—
|—
|—
|5
|—
|—
|—
|
|-
! scope="row" | Comme un soleil|
Released: 1971
Label: Fontana
Formats: LP
|—
|—
|—
|—
|—
|—
|—
|—
|—
|—
|
CRIA: Gold
|-
! scope="row" | British Concert|
Released: 1972
Label: Fontana
Formats: LP
|—
|—
|—
|—
|—
|—
|—
|—
|—
|29
|
CRIA: Platinum
|-
! scope="row" | Greatest Hits|
Released: 1972
Label: Fontana
Formats: LP
|—
|—
|—
|—
|—
|—
|6
|—
|—
|—
|
|-
! scope="row" | Une voix qui vient du cœur|
Released: 1972
Label: Fontana
Formats: LP, cassette
|—
|—
|—
|—
|—
|—
|—
|—
|—
|—
|
CRIA: Gold
|-
! scope="row" | Christmas With Nana Mouskouri|
Released: 1972
Label: Fontana
Formats: LP, cassette
|—
|—
|—
|—
|—
|—
|—
|—
|—
|—
|
CRIA: Platinum
|-
! scope="row" | Songs From Her TV Series|
Released: 1973
Label: Fontana
Formats: LP
|—
|—
|—
|—
|—
|—
|—
|—
|—
|29
|
|-
! scope="row" | Spotlight On Nana Mouskouri|
Released: 1973
Label: Fontana
Formats: LP
|—
|—
|—
|—
|—
|—
|—
|—
|—
|38
|
CRIA: Gold
|-
! scope="row" | Nana Mouskouri's Greatest Hits|
Released: 1973
Label: Fontana
Formats: LP
|—
|—
|—
|—
|—
|—
|—
|15
|—
|—
|
|-
! scope="row" | Nana Mouskouri I|
Released: 1974
Label: Impact
Formats: LP
|—
|—
|—
|—
|—
|—
|—
|—
|—
|—
|
SNEP: Gold
|-
! scope="row" | Nana's Book Of Songs|
Released: 1974
Label: Fontana
Formats: LP
|—
|—
|—
|—
|—
|—
|3
|—
|—
|—
|
|-
! scope="row" | Sieben Schwarze Rosen|
Released: 1975
Label: Phillips
Formats: LP, cassette, CD
|—
|—
|—
|—
|—
|18
|—
|—
|—
|—
|
BVMI: Gold
|-
! scope="row" | Een Stem Uit Het Hart|
Released: 1975
Label: Phillips
Formats: LP
|—
|—
|—
|—
|—
|—
|14
|—
|—
|—
|
|-
! scope="row" | Die Welt Ist Voll Licht|
Released: 1976
Label: Phillips
Formats: LP, cassette, CD
|—
|5
|—
|—
|—
|14
|—
|—
|—
|—
|
BVMI: Gold
|-
! scope="row" | Nana Mouskouri Singt Die Schönsten Deutschen Weihnachtslieder|
Released: 1976
Label: Phillips
Formats: LP, cassette, CD
|—
|—
|—
|—
|—
|—
|—
|—
|—
|—
|
BVMI: Gold
|-
! scope="row" | Nana In Holland|
Released: 1976
Label: Phillips
Formats: LP
|—
|—
|—
|—
|—
|—
|12
|—
|—
|—
|
|-
! scope="row" | Passport|
Released: 1976
Label: Fontana
Formats: LP
|—
|—
|—
|—
|—
|—
|9
|—
|5
|3
|
BPI: Gold
|-
! scope="row" | Glück Ist Wie Ein Schmetterling|
Released: 1978
Label: Phillips
Formats: LP, cassette, CD
|—
|—
|—
|—
|—
|31
|—
|—
|—
|—
|
|-
! scope="row" | Lieder, Die Die Liebe Schreibt|
Released: 1978
Label: Phillips
Formats: LP, cassette, CD
|—
|—
|—
|—
|—
|24
|—
|—
|—
|—
|
BVMI: Gold
|-
! scope="row" | Roses & Sunshine|
Released: 1979
Label: Cachet Records
Formats: LP
|—
|—
|—
|—
|—
|—
|—
|—
|—
|—
|
CRIA: 2× Platinum
|-
! scope="row" | Come With Me|
Released: 1980
Label: Grand Records
Formats: LP, cassette
|—
|—
|—
|—
|—
|—
|—
|—
|—
|—
|
CRIA: Platinum
|-
! scope="row" | Je chante avec toi liberté|
Released: 1981
Label: Phillips
Formats: LP, cassette
|—
|—
|—
|—
|—
|—
|—
|—
|—
|—
|
CRIA: Platinum
|-
! scope="row" | Meine Lieder Sind Mein Leben|
Released: 1981
Label: Phillips
Formats: LP, cassette
|—
|—
|—
|—
|—
|26
|—
|—
|—
|—
|
|-
! scope="row" | Alles Liebe...|
Released: 1981
Label: Phillips
Formats: LP, cassette
|—
|2
|—
|—
|—
|2
|—
|—
|—
|—
|
BVMI: Gold
|-
! scope="row" | The Very Best Of Nana Mouskouri |
Released: 1981
Label: Fontana
Formats: LP
|—
|—
|—
|—
|—
|—
|—
|10
|—
|—
|
|-
! scope="row" | Song For Liberty|
Released: 1982
Label: Phillips
Formats: LP, cassette
|—
|—
|—
|—
|—
|—
|—
|—
|—
|—
|
CRIA: Gold
|-
! scope="row" | Ma vérite|
Released: 1985
Label: Phillips
Formats: LP, cassette
|—
|—
|—
|—
|—
|—
|—
|—
|—
|—
|
CRIA: Gold
|-
! scope="row" | Alone|
Released: 1985
Label: Fontana
Formats: LP
|—
|—
|—
|—
|—
|—
|14
|—
|—
|19
|
BPI: Silver
NVPI: Gold
|-
! scope="row" | Con Toda El Alma|
Released: 1986
Label: Phillips
Formats: LP, CD, cassette
|—
|—
|—
|—
|—
|—
|—
|—
|1
|—
|
Promusicae: 3× Platinum
|-
! scope="row" | Libertad|
Released: 1986
Label: Phillips
Formats: LP, CD, cassette
|—
|—
|—
|—
|—
|—
|—
|—
|3
|—
|
CAPIF: 2× Platinum
Promusicae: Gold
|-
! scope="row" | Kleine Wahrheiten|
Released: 1986
Label: Mercury
Formats: LP, CD, cassette
|—
|—
|—
|—
|—
|49
|—
|—
|—
|—
|
|-
! scope="row" | Only Love Songs|
Released: 1986
Label: Phillips
Formats: LP
|—
|—
|—
|—
|—
|—
|28
|—
|—
|—
|
|-
! scope="row" | Why Worry|
Released: 1987
Label: Phillips
Formats: LP, CD, cassette
|—
|—
|—
|—
|—
|—
|50
|—
|—
|—
|
|-
! scope="row" | Tierra Viva|
Released: 1987
Label: Phillips
Formats: LP, CD, cassette
|—
|—
|—
|—
|—
|—
|—
|—
|5
|—
|
|-
! scope="row" | Nana|
Released: 1987
Label: Phillips
Formats: LP, CD, cassette
|—
|—
|—
|—
|—
|—
|—
|—
|3
|—
|
Promusicae: Gold
|-
! scope="row" | Master Serie|
Released: 1987
Label: Philips
Formats: CD
|—
|—
|—
|—
|—
|—
|—
|—
|—
|—
|
SNEP: Gold
|-
! scope="row" | A Voice From The Heart|
Released: 1988
Label: Phillips
Formats: LP, CD, cassette
|—
|—
|—
|—
|—
|—
|—
|—
|1
|—
|
NVPI: Gold
|-
! scope="row" | The Magic of Nana Mouskouri|
Released: 1988
Label: Philips
Formats: LP, CD, cassette
|—
|—
|—
|—
|—
|—
|—
|—
|—
|44
|
BPI: Gold
|-
! scope="row" | The Classical Nana|
Released: 1989
Label: Phillips
Formats: LP, CD, cassette
|—
|—
|—
|—
|—
|—
|—
|—
|—
|—
|
CAPIF: Platinum
|-
! scope="row" | Concierto En Aranjuez|
Released: 1989
Label: Phillips
Formats: LP, CD, cassette
|—
|—
|—
|—
|—
|—
|—
|—
|8
|—
|
Promusicae: Platinum
|-
! scope="row" | Nuestras Canciones|
Released: 1991
Label: Phillips
Formats: LP, CD, cassette
|—
|—
|—
|—
|—
|—
|—
|—
|8
|—
|
Promusicae: Platinum
|-
! scope="row" | The Best Of Nana Mouskouri|
Released: 1992
Label: Phillips
Formats: CD
|—
|—
|—
|—
|—
|—
|—
|—
|—
|—
|
CRIA: Platinum
|-
! scope="row" | Recuerdos|
Released: 1994
Label: Phillips
Formats: LP, CD, cassette
|—
|—
|—
|—
|—
|—
|—
|—
|—
|—
|
Promusicae: Gold
|-
! scope="row" | Les Triomphes de Nana Mouskouri |
Released: 1995
Label: Phillips
Formats: CD
|—
|—
|49
|—
|—
|—
|—
|—
|—
|—
|
|-
! scope="row" | Hommages|
Released: 1997
Label: Phillips
Formats: CD
|—
|—
|—
|—
|46
|—
|—
|—
|—
|—
|
|-
! scope="row" | Classic|
Released: 2001
Label: Mercury
Formats: CD
|—
|—
|—
|—
|70
|49
|—
|—
|—
|—
|
|-
! scope="row" | At Her Very Best|
Released: 2001
Label: Philips
Formats: CD
|—
|—
|—
|—
|—
|—
|—
|—
|—
|39
|
BPI: Silver
|-
! scope="row" | Erinnerungen - meine grössten Erfolge|
Released: 2001
Label: Mercury
Formats: CD
|—
|—
|—
|—
|—
|68
|—
|—
|—
|—
|
|-
! scope="row" | Boleros Canciones Recuerdos|
Released: 2002
Label: Mercury
Formats: CD
|—
|—
|—
|—
|—
|—
|—
|—
|50
|—
|
|-
! scope="row" | Fille du soleil|
Released: 2002
Label: Mercury
Formats: CD
|—
|—
|—
|—
|98
|—
|—
|—
|—
|—
|
|-
! scope="row" | Ich Hab Gelacht Ich Hab Geweint|
Released: 2004
Label: Koch Universal
Formats: CD
|—
|40
|—
|—
|—
|61
|—
|—
|—
|—
|
|-
! scope="row" | Gold: Greatest Hits|
Released: 2002
Label: Phillips
Formats: CD
|—
|—
|—
|—
|—
|—
|—
|—
|—
|—
|
CRIA: Gold
|-
! scope="row" | The Definitive Collection|
Released: 2005
Label: Mercury
Formats: CD
|—
|—
|—
|—
|—
|—
|—
|20
|—
|—
|
|-
! scope="row" | I'll Remember|
Released: 2005
Label: Mercury
Formats: CD
|22
|—
|—
|—
|—
|—
|—
|37
|—
|—
|
|-
! scope="row" | Meine Schönsten Welterfolge|
Released: 2008
Label: Mercury
Formats: CD
|—
|—
|—
|—
|—
|99
|—
|—
|—
|—
|
|-
! scope="row" | Rendez-vous|
Released: 2011
Label: Mercury
Formats: CD
|—
|—
|46
|—
|14
|—
|—
|—
|—
|—
|
|-
! scope="row" | Tragoudia Apo Ta Ellinikia|
Released: 2011
Label: Mercury
Formats: CD
|2
|—
|—
|—
|—
|—
|—
|—
|—
|—
|
|-
! scope="row" | Happy Birthday Tour|
Released: 2014
Label: Mercury
Formats: CD
|—
|—
|63
|—
|112
|—
|—
|—
|—
|—
|
|-
! scope="row" | Forever Young|
Released: 2018
Label: Mercury
Formats: CD
|—
|—
|66
|73
|83
|99
|—
|—
|—
|—
|
|-
! scope="row" | Quand on s'aime - Tribute to Michel Legrand|
Released: 2019
Label: Mercury
Formats: CD
|—
|—
|126
|—
|—
|—
|—
|—
|—
|—
|
|-
! scope="row" | Chants sacrés|
Released: 2019
Label: Mercury
Formats: CD
|—
|—
|76
|—
|106
|—
|—
|—
|—
|—
|
|-
|}

Autobiographies
 Το όνομά μου είναι Νάνα (To ónomá mou eínai Nána, "My Name Is Nana"), by Nana Mouskouri, Livani Publishing, Athens 2006. ,  .

Further reading
 Poilly-Genoud, Audrey. Nana Mouskouri, une fragilité fondatrice: quelques notes éparses sur les lunettes de Nana Mouskouri''. Paris: l'Harmattan, 2010

See also

 List of Greek musical artists
 List of multilingual bands and artists
 List of people from Crete

References

External links

Official
 Nana Mouskouri's profile at UNICEF
 Nana Mouskouri international Fan Club
 German Fan club website – 
 Nana Mouskouri at Universal Music France

Biographies
 

Discography
 
 
  Site québécois de Nana Mouskouri Biography, discography by language, list of 1 800 recordings, covers magazines, TV in Quebec, drawings, memories et topicalities.

Filmography
 

Political career
 

Living people
20th-century Greek women singers
People from Chania
Eurovision Song Contest entrants for Luxembourg
Greek entehno singers
Greek folk singers
Greek pop singers
Greek sopranos
20th-century Greek women politicians
Singers from Athens
English-language singers from Greece
German-language singers
French-language singers
Spanish-language singers
Latin-language singers
Hebrew-language singers
Italian-language singers
Japanese-language singers
Greek pacifists
Greek expatriates in Switzerland
Thessaloniki Song Festival entrants
Eurovision Song Contest entrants of 1963
MEPs for Greece 1994–1999
20th-century women MEPs for Greece
UNICEF Goodwill Ambassadors
Singers from Crete
New Democracy (Greece) MEPs
Fontana Records artists
Mercury Records artists
Philips Records artists
Polydor Records artists
Cretan women
Politicians from Chania
Officers of the National Order of Quebec
Commandeurs of the Légion d'honneur
Commanders of the Order of Merit of the Grand Duchy of Luxembourg
Officiers of the Ordre des Arts et des Lettres
Commanders of the Order of Beneficence (Greece)
1934 births